In 2020, the main athletic events were scheduled to be the 2020 Summer Olympics held in Tokyo, Japan, the 2020 World Athletics Indoor Championships held in Nanjing, China and the 2020 IAAF World Half Marathon Championships held in Gdynia, Poland. All three were rescheduled due to the COVID-19 pandemic with the 2020 IAAF World Half Marathon Championships being the only event still held in 2020.

Major championships

World 

 Olympic Games
 Paralympic Games
 World Half Marathon Championships
 World U20 Championships
 World Mountain Running Championships

Regional 

 African Championships
 Asian Indoor Championships
 European Championships
 European Throwing Cup
 CARIFTA Games
 South American Indoor Championships
 Pan American Cross Country Cup

World and continental athletics events
 February 15: 2020 Balkan Athletics Indoor Championships in  Istanbul
 60 m winners:  Konstantinos Zikos (m) /  Diana Vaisman (f)
 400 m winners:  Ivan Budzynskyi (m) /  Andrea Miklós (f)
 800 m winners:  Yevhen Hutsol (m) /  Cristina Daniela Bălan (f)
 1500 m winners:  Elzan Bibić (m) /  Roxana Bârcă (f)
 3000 m winners:  Andreas Vojta (m) /  Luiza Gega (f)
 60 m Hurdles winners:  Mikdat Sevler (m) /  Ivana Lončarek (f)
 Long Jump winners:  Izmir Smajlaj (m) /  Florentina Iusco (f)
 Triple Jump winners:  Nazim Babayev (m) /  Elena Panțuroiu (f)
 High Jump winners:  Dmytro Nikitin (m) /  Yuliya Chumachenko (f)
 Pole Vault winners:  Ersu Şaşma (m) /  Iana Gladiichuk (f)
 Shot Put winners:  Mesud Pezer (m) /  Dimitriana Surdu (f)
 4 × 400 m winners:  (m) /  (f)
 March 7: 2020 World University Cross Country Championships in  Marrakesh
 March 29: 2020 IAAF World Half Marathon Championships in  Gdynia
 May 2 & 3: 2020 World Athletics Race Walking Team Championships in  Minsk
 July 7 – 12: 2020 World Athletics U20 Championships in  Nairobi
 July 16 – 19: 2020 European Athletics U18 Championships in  Rieti
 August 26 – 30: 2020 European Athletics Championships in  Paris
 December 13: 2020 European Cross Country Championships in  Dublin

Annual competitions

 Diamond League
 Continental Tour
 IAAF Hammer Throw Challenge
 World Marathon Majors
 Tokyo Marathon
 Boston Marathon (cancelled due to the COVID-19 pandemic)
 London Marathon
 Berlin Marathon (cancelled due to the COVID-19 pandemic)
 Chicago Marathon (cancelled due to the COVID-19 pandemic)
 New York City Marathon (cancelled due to the COVID-19 pandemic)
 IAAF Road Race Label Events

Season's bests

Outdoor season's top ten performers
All information on the season's top ten performers in outdoor events is published by World Athletics.

100 metres

200 metres

400 metres

800 metres

1500 metres

5000 metres

10,000 metres

110/100 metres hurdles

400 metres hurdles

3000 metres steeplechase

Half marathon

Marathon

Pole vault

High jump

Long jump

Triple jump

Shot put

Discus throw

Javelin throw

Hammer throw

Decathlon/Heptathlon

Competitions winners

2019–2020 EA Cross Country Permit Meetings
 September 28, 2019: TCS Lidingöloppet in  Lidingö (CC #1)
 Winners:  Robel Fsiha (m) /  Sylvia Medugu (f)
 November 24, 2019: Cross de l'Acier in  Leffrinckoucke (CC #2)
 Winners:  Berihu Aregawi (m) /  Aberash Belay (f)
 Winners:  Mike Foppen (m) /  Anna Emilie Møller (f)
 December 1, 2019: Cross Internacional de la Constitución in  Aranda de Duero (CC #4)
 Winners:  Thierry Ndikumwenayo (m) /  Marta Pérez (f)

References

External links 

 World Athletics official website

 
Athletics
2020